Michael Preston (born Jack Davies; 14 May 1938) is an English international film and television actor, and singer, sometimes credited as Mike Preston.

Life and career
Preston was born in Hackney, London, England. He was a boxer and then became a singer.

He appeared on Oh Boy! and his third record, "Dirty Old Town" (1959) was produced by Joe Meek. He had three Top 40 hits in the UK Singles Chart, including reaching No. 12 with his cover version of "Mr. Blue" in November 1959, before emigrating to Australia where he worked as a nightclub singer.

He then became a host on television, and also an actor. He was a regular host on In Melbourne Tonight in 1968, and in 1969 was a guest celebrity on the game show The Celebrity Game and went on to host the revival in 1976–1977.

His first ongoing starring role on television was in the long-running police drama series Homicide as Sen. Det. Bob Delaney from 1972 to 1973. He then had a recurring role in the soap opera Bellbird as Fr. John Kramer between 1974 and 1976. He later took a lead role in the prison-based soap opera Punishment (1981) but this series was short-lived. In 1984, he had an ongoing role in Hot Pursuit, as the character Alec Shaw.

Preston has made numerous guest appearances in television series, including The A-Team, Max Headroom, Airwolf, Scarecrow and Mrs. King, Alien Nation, Ellen, and Highlander. He also made an appearance in the series Baywatch Nights.

Preston has also acted in films. His first feature film was Surabaya Conspiracy (1969); other film roles included playing Pappagallo in Mad Max 2 (1981), his best-known role, and Jared-Syn in the science fiction B-movie Metalstorm: The Destruction of Jared-Syn (1983). He was nominated for the 1979 AACTA Award for Best Actor in a Leading Role for his role in The Last of the Knucklemen.

Selected TV and filmography
Climb Up the Wall - (1960) - Himself, (singing next to the Albert Memorial)
Surabaya Conspiracy (1969) - Steven Blessing
Barney (1976) - O'Shaughnessy
The Last of the Knucklemen (1979) - Pansy
Maybe This Time (1981) - Paddy
Mad Max 2 (1981) - Pappagallo
Duet for Four (1982) - Ray Martin
Metalstorm: The Destruction of Jared-Syn (1983) - Jared-Syn
A Caribbean Mystery (1983, TV movie) - Arthur Jackson 
Blade in Hong Kong (1985, TV movie) - Charters
J.O.E. and the Colonel (1985, TV movie) - Schaefer
The Return of Mickey Spillane's Mike Hammer (1986, TV movie) - David 'Dak' Anson Kola
Hunter (1987) -  Evans (as Mike Preston) 
Airwolf (1987, TV series) - Jack Ware
Fame (1987, TV series) - Jack Ware
Harry's Hong Kong (1987, TV movie) - Max Trumble
The Long Journey Home (1987, TV movie) - Frank Mota
Perry Mason: The Case of the Lady in the Lake (1988, TV movie) - Waiter
Exile (1990, TV Movie) - Rupe Murphy
Superboy (1990) - 2nd Police Officer 
Alien Nation (1990) - Rigac
Jake and the Fatman (1991) - Vorster 
Renegade (1995, TV series) - Nick Schneider
Highlander: The Series (1995) - Terrence Kincaid 
Steel (1997) - Mr. Weston (uncredited)
The Getaway (2002, video game) - Harry 'The Hat' (voice)

Discography
"A House, A Car And A Wedding Ring" / "My Lucky Love" (1958) – (US No. 93, Aust No. 18) (Decca)
"Why, Why Why" / "Whispering Grass" (1958)
"In Surabaya" / "Dirty Old Town" (1959)
"Mr. Blue" / "Just Ask Your Heart" (1959) (UK No. 12)
"Too Old" / "A Girl Like You" (1960)
"I'd Do Anything" / "Where Is Love" (1960) (UK No. 23)
"Togetherness" / "Farewell My Love" (1960) (UK No. 41)
"Marry Me" / "Girl Without a Heart" (1961) (UK No. 14)
"Punish Her" / "From the Very First Rose" (1963)
"Dear Heart" / "Wonderful, Wonderful World" (1968) (Aust No. 20 Kent chart, No. 34 Go-Set chart) (Spin Records)
"Christmas Alphabet" (1968) (Aust No. 71 Kent chart) (Spin Records)
"Buona Sera Mrs. Campbell" (1969) (Aust No. 64 Kent chart) (Spin Records)
"Why" (1972) (Aust No. 70) (Fable Records)

See also
List of artists under the Decca Records label

References

External links

1938 births
Living people
English emigrants to Australia
English male film actors
English male singers
English male soap opera actors
Decca Records artists
People from Hackney Central